François Gesseau Chouteau (February 7, 1797 – April 18, 1838) was an American pioneer fur trader, entrepreneur, and community leader known as the "Father of Kansas City". He was born in St. Louis, established the first fur trading post of western Missouri, and settled the area that became Kansas City, Missouri. His second wife birthed nine children, and he had a son with a woman of the Osage Nation.

Early life
François Gesseau Chouteau was born in 1797 in St. Louis, Missouri. The city had been founded 33 years prior by his uncle Auguste Chouteau, and was still under the authority of New Spain. His French-born parents were prominent fur trader Jean Pierre Chouteau and his second wife Brigitte Saucier. In his youth, François learned his father's trade, which was the basis of the early wealth of the city. The Chouteau family company was considered "King of the Fur Trade".

On July 12, 1819, Chouteau married Bérénice Thérèse Ménard in St. Louis. She was originally from Cahokia (Kaskaskia, Illinois), and also of French descent. Her father was the first Lieutenant Governor of the neighboring state of Illinois, so this marriage united two powerful families. They honeymooned along the Missouri River while prospecting for land to build a trading post.

Fur trading
Chouteau soon started fur trading expeditions into the western frontier via the Missouri River. In 1819, Chouteau and his cousin Gabriel S. Sères set up a temporary trading post for John Jacob Astor's American Fur Company on the Randolph Bluffs along the Missouri River in Clay County, western Missouri. Seeking an ideal place for a permanent post, they investigated several other locations as far north as Council Bluffs, Iowa.

Chouteau, with his wife and his brother Cyprien, finally chose a site on the Missouri River, west of the Randolph Bluffs post and a few miles east of the mouth of the River Canses (now called the Kaw or Kansas River). The new place was called Chouteau's Landing, located near the north end of what became Grand Avenue in Kansas City, Missouri. In 1821, it became the area's first permanent European-American settlement.

Several trappers joined them in 1825, including Gabriel Prud'homme and his family, who were returning from an expedition in the Snake River region. Chouteau partnered with Prud’homme and his brother Cyprien, to create a fur company, with a warehouse as headquarters. The company concentrated on western trading routes and engaged other members of the family. Due to a flood in 1826, Chouteau moved his trading post to higher ground near what is now Troost Avenue's proximity to the river. Chouteau traveled widely throughout the new Kansas Territory, trading manufactured goods for animal pelts from the Shawnee, Kickapoo, and other tribes, with whom he had established long-standing good relations.

His American Fur Company warehouse supplied the intense demand for furs and beaver hats in the eastern US and in Europe. Its inventory came from his licensed trade with the tribes, and from  his employees trapping and hunting in the Rocky Mountains.

The settlement was called Chez les Cansès (lit. "Town of Kansas"). Chouteau, his wife, and their family continued to expand. They established a home on the bluffs above the Missouri River and were active in the early French community. In 1835, Pierre La Liberté built a log cabin church dedicated to St. Francis Regis. French missionary Father Bénédict Roux became its first parish priest. So many members of Chouteau's extended family were congregants that it became known as Chouteau's Church, and Bérénice became its most important patron. Kansas City's Cathedral of the Immaculate Conception was built on the same site.

Death
On April 18, 1838, François Chouteau died at age 41, probably of a heart attack, in Westport (now part of Kansas City, Missouri). His funeral was held at the Old Cathedral of St. Louis one week later, on April 25. He is interred at Calvary Cemetery in St. Louis. His plot is marked by a tall obelisk, and includes his grave and those of his mother, Brigitte (Saucier) Chouteau, and three children who died young: Louis-Amédée, Louis-Sylvestre, and Benedict Chouteau. François Chouteau is called the "Founder of Kansas City". During his lifetime, only the city of West Port, now part of Kansas City, had been developed. The Town of Kansas was chartered in 1850, part of what became Kansas City.

Widow
His widow Bérénice Chouteau supported her family in merchandising the Chouteau family trade business, later running a retail store. She remained active in the church and community, and was called the "Mother of Kansas City" and the "Grande Dame of Kansas City". John Calvin McCoy, founder of West Port, called her "the soul of the colony".

Due to the Civil War's areawide violence culminating in the Battle of Westport, she moved for safety back to eastern Missouri, first to Ste. Genevieve, Missouri, and then across the river to Kaskaskia, Illinois. In 1867, two years after the end of the war, she returned to Kansas City with her son Pierre Chouteau and his wife. Bérénice outlived all her children, dying in 1888 at age 87.

Children
François and Bérénice Chouteau had nine children, and he had one with a member of the Osage Nation.

Married in 1819 to Bérénice Thérèse Ménard (b. 1801-d. 1888):
Edmond François Chouteau, b. 1821 in St. Louis–d. 1853 in Jackson County, Missouri
Pierre Menard Chouteau, b. 1822 in St. Louis–d. 1885 in Jackson County, Missouri; married Marie Anne Polk
Louis Amédée Chouteau, b. 1825 in St. Louis–d. 1827 in St. Louis
Louis Sylvestre Chouteau, b. 1827 in St. Louis–d. 1829 in St. Louis
Benjamin Chouteau, b. 1828 in St. Louis–d. 1871 in St. Louis; married Anne E. Toler
Frederick D. Chouteau, b. 1831 in Independence, Missouri–d. after 1870; married Adèle Gregoire
Benedict Pharamond Chouteau, b. 1833 in Jackson County, Missouri–d. 1834 in St. Louis
Mary Brigite Chouteau, b. 1835 in Jackson County, Missouri–d. 1864 in St. Louis; married Ashley C. Hopkins
Thérèse Odile Chouteau, b. 1837 in Jackson County, Missouri–d. 1837 in Jackson County

Osage offspring:
James G. Chouteau, b. before 1825; He was identified by name to receive 640 acres (one section) of land reserved for "half-breeds" according to a provision in Article 5 of the 1825 Osage Treaty.

Legacy
Chouteau is regarded as the founder of Kansas City, Missouri. In 2021, the Osage Nation committed  toward creating the Chouteau Heritage Fountain with the Kansas City Parks Department, to commemorate the pioneering history of trade between Europeans and the tribes, most recently with Chouteau.

References

Further reading
 

1797 births
1838 deaths
American merchants
American city founders
Businesspeople from St. Louis
American people of French descent
Burials at Calvary Cemetery (St. Louis)
19th-century American businesspeople